Blaize Punter (born 26 December 1996) is a footballer who plays as a defender for  side Bedworth United. Born in England, he represents the Antigua and Barbuda national team at international level.

Club career

Mansfield Town
Punter joined Mansfield Town in the summer of 2014 before moving to Nuneaton Town in the summer of 2015 to join the club's Under-21 team.

Barwell
In 2015, he spent a period on dual registration terms at Barwell before joining the club on a permanent basis. During his time at Barwell, he also spent time on dual-registration at Quorn, a team he then joined briefly in the summer of 2016 for a second period.

Kettering Town
In August 2016 he joined Kettering Town

Rugby Town
Punter then joined Rugby Town in October 2016.

AFC Rushden & Diamonds
In August 2017 he signed for AFC Rushden & Diamonds, having earned a deal after appearing for the club in pre-season friendly matches.

Bedworth United
On 12 September 2019, Punter signed for Southern League Division One Central side Bedworth United.

International career
Punter was called up by Antigua and Barbuda for the first time in 2016 and made his full international debut as a substitute on 8 October 2016 in a 2017 Caribbean Cup qualification third round group 3 match against Puerto Rico.

References

External links
 
 
 

1996 births
Living people
English sportspeople of Antigua and Barbuda descent
Antigua and Barbuda footballers
English footballers
Footballers from Leicester
Association football defenders
Antigua and Barbuda international footballers
Kettering Town F.C. players
Rugby Town F.C. players
Mansfield Town F.C. players
Nuneaton Borough F.C. players
Barwell F.C. players
Quorn F.C. players
AFC Rushden & Diamonds players
Bedworth United F.C. players
Antigua and Barbuda expatriate footballers